The Train Robbers is a 1973 American Western film written and directed by Burt Kennedy and starring John Wayne, Ann-Margret, Rod Taylor, Ben Johnson, and Ricardo Montalbán. Filming took place in Sierra de Órganos National Park in the town of Sombrerete, Mexico. Two brief scenes take place in the square that was used for the final shootout in Butch Cassidy and the Sundance Kid.

Plot
After the death of her husband, Mrs. Lowe wants to tell the railroad where to find the half-million U.S. dollars in gold her late husband, Matt, stole during a train robbery, and clear the family name for her son. Instead Lane convinces her to retrieve the gold so she can collect the $50,000 reward offered by the railroad for its return. Lane lines up some old friends to assist him in retrieving the gold for a share of the reward. But the other original train robbers have gathered a gang and will try to get the gold at any cost. As they all journey into Mexico in search of the hidden gold they are followed closely by an unnamed Pinkerton agent who is working for Wells Fargo.

After a series of adventures and battles they return to Texas with the gold where there is one final battle. The next day Lane and his men put Mrs. Lowe on a train to return the gold and tell her she can keep the reward for herself and her son. As they are walking past the end of the train they meet the Pinkerton Agent who tells them, as the train is pulling out, that Matt Lowe was never married and that Mrs. Lowe is really a prostitute named Lilly who fooled them into helping her get the gold for herself. Lane then leads his gang to rob the train as the film ends.

Cast
 John Wayne as Lane
 Ann-Margret as Lilly Lowe
 Rod Taylor as Grady
 Ben Johnson as Jesse 
 Christopher George as Calhoun 
 Bobby Vinton as Ben Young
 Jerry Gatlin as Sam Turner
 Ricardo Montalbán as The Pinkerton man (credited as Ricardo Montalban)

Reception
Roger Ebert of the Chicago Sun-Times gave the film three stars out of four and called it "fairly good, in a quiet and workmanlike sort of way, although there's a plot twist at the end that ruins things unnecessarily. But what’s best about it, what makes it worth seeing, is Kennedy’s visual approach to the subject of John Wayne." Roger Greenspun of The New York Times wrote, "I don't think that tone and attitude are quite enough to sustain a movie, or that an air of good feeling can take the place of meaningful dramatic action. But as an exercise in pleasantness, 'The Train Robbers' is an interesting addition to the late history of the traditional unpretentious Western." Arthur D. Murphy of Variety called it "an above-average John Wayne actioner, written and directed by Burt Kennedy with suspense, comedy and humanism not usually found in the formula." Gene Siskel of the Chicago Tribune gave the film three stars out of four and declared that John Wayne's "legend not only lives in 'The Train Robbers,' it gleams." Kevin Thomas of the Los Angeles Times wrote, "In the light of the current—and largely admirable—cycle of revisionist westerns that lay waste to those cherished myths of the frontier, it's downright reassuring to watch an amiable, traditional-style John Wayne adventure . . . There's a neat balance between action and comedy, and Wayne himself is in top form."

The film holds a score of 33% on Rotten Tomatoes based on 6 reviews.

Quentin Tarantino later called it "so light it's barely a movie, but that doesn’t mean it’s not amusing."

See also
 List of American films of 1973
John Wayne filmography

References

External links
 
 
 
 
 
 

1973 Western (genre) films
Batjac Productions films
Films directed by Burt Kennedy
Rail transport films
Films produced by John Wayne
1973 films
American Western (genre) films
Films scored by Dominic Frontiere
Films shot in Mexico
1970s English-language films
1970s American films
Films about train robbery